Reinhardt may refer to:

 Reinhardt University, Waleska, Georgia, USA

People 
 Reinhardt (surname)
 Reinhardt Kristensen, Danish invertebrate biologist
 Reinhardt Rahr, American politician

Fictional characters 
 Reinhardt (Overwatch), a character from the 2016 video game
 Reinhardt, a character from Fire Emblem: Thracia 776

See also 
 Reinhard
 Reinhart
 Rinehart
 Operation Reinhard, a particularly deadly part of the Holocaust

Germanic given names
German masculine given names
Dutch masculine given names